The Netherlands women's national under-19 football team represents the Netherlands at the UEFA Women's Under-19 Championship and is controlled by the Royal Dutch Football Association.

Fixtures and results

 Legend

2022

 Fixtures and results (Netherlands Under 20) – Soccerway.com

Coaches

 Ruud Dokter
 Bep Timmer
 Ed Engelkes
 Corné Groenendijk
 Hesterine de Reus (2007–2010)
 Johan van Heertum (2010–2012)
 Aart Korenhoff (2012–2013)
 André Koolhof (2013–2015)
 Jessica Torny (2015–2020)
 Roos Kwakkenbos (2021–present)

Competitive record

UEFA Women's Under-19 Championship

The Dutch team has qualified for the UEFA Under-19 Championship finals on ten occasions, winning the tournament in 2014. On that occasion, Vivianne Miedema was the top scorer with six goals and also collected the Golden Player award.

FIFA U-20 Women's World Cup
The Dutch team has qualified for the FIFA U-20 Women's World Cup finals on two occasions.

See also

 Netherlands women's national football team
 Netherlands women's national under-17 football team
 FIFA U-20 Women's World Cup
 UEFA Women's Under-19 Championship

References

National
Women's national under-19 association football teams
Football
European women's national under-19 association football teams